Vermont Route 66 (VT 66) is a short  state highway located entirely within the town of Randolph in Orange County, Vermont, United States. It serves as a connection between the center and east side of the town.

Vermont Technical College is located near the midpoint of Route 66, about a mile east of its interchange with Interstate 89 (I-89).

Route description
Route 66 begins at an intersection with Route 12 in downtown Randolph, near the southern terminus of Route 12A.  It runs northeast towards the town center and interchanges with I-89 at Exit 4.  Route 66 continues east into Randolph Center, where it passes Vermont Technical College.  Route 66 turns to the north and then to the east out of the town center, before cutting to the southeast and ending at Route 14 in East Randolph.

Major intersections

References

External links

066
Transportation in Orange County, Vermont